Weideman is a surname. Notable people with the surname include:

Carl M. Weideman (1898–1972), American politician
Francois Weideman (1960–2001), South African cricketer
George Weideman (1947–2008), South African poet and writer
Graeme Weideman (born 1934), Australian pharmacist and politician
Jaap Weideman (1936–1996), South African admiral
Mark Weideman (born 1961), Australian rules footballer
Murray Weideman (born 1936), Australian rules footballer
Peter Weideman (born 1940), Australian rules footballer
Sam Weideman (born 1997), Australian rules footballer

See also
Weidemann